Roderick (Rory) MacDonald  (Scottish Gaelic: Ruaraidh Dòmhnallach /ruərɪ dɔ̃ːnəlˠəx/) was the bassist of the Scottish Celtic rock band Runrig, as well as their primary songwriter with his younger brother, Calum Macdonald. Generally, Rory wrote the melodies, and Calum the lyrics. After former lead singer Donnie Munro left the band in 1997, Rory took lead vocal duties on songs in the band's catalogue written in the Scottish Gaelic language, as the band's new lead singer, Bruce Guthro, was not a Gaelic speaker.

In the mid to the late 1960s, Macdonald was a part of a band called The Skyvers.

MacDonald previously attended the Glasgow School of Art and had a promising career as a graphic designer until Runrig went 'professional'. Later putting these skills into practice, he designed the sleeve notes for Runrig's Recovery and Heartland albums.

Early life
Macdonald was born in Dornoch, Sutherland. His father, Donald John MacDonald of North Uist, Outer Hebrides, was a World War II veteran. The family moved to North Uist, when Rory was about four years old. On arrival in Lochmaddy, his younger brother Calum was born.

During the Second World War, Macdonald's father, Donald, and his unit were ambushed in Normandy. He witnessed the death of his best friend, Sandy MacIntyre. After this, Donald used to visit Sandy's family. On one such occasion, when Rory was eight, he was taken along to Sandy's old home. There, Sandy's parents gave him his old accordion. Back home, he began practising, playing at school concerts. On this accordion he wrote his first ever tune: a Scottish dance march called  "Sandy MacIntyre". This experience partly inspired the 1985 song "The Everlasting Gun", featured on the Heartland album, along with news of the Falklands War.

References

External links
The Official Runrig website

People from Sutherland
20th-century Scottish male singers
Scottish bass guitarists
Scottish songwriters
Living people
Runrig members
Male bass guitarists
1949 births
People educated at Portree High School
21st-century Scottish male singers
British male songwriters